The Anomochilidae, or anomochilids, are a monotypic family of snakes, created for the genus Anomochilus, which currently contains three species. It is commonly called the dwarf pipe snake.

Description

The eyes are reduced, and there are no teeth on the premaxiila, pterygoid, or palatine. A tracheal lung is absent. Anomochilids retain some pelvic elements, indicated externally by cloacal spurs. The tails are relatively short. Females have two well developed oviducts. Anomochilids have white or yellow patterns against a darker reddish background.

Behaviour and habitat
Anomochilids are probably fossorial.

Diet
Cranial and dentary morphology suggests that anomochilids probably eat small invertebrates.

Reproduction
One of the museum specimens of Anomochilus was found to contain four eggs, suggesting oviparity, but nothing else is known of anomochilid reproduction or behavior.

Taxonomy
Phylogenetic analysis suggests that Anomochilus is morphologically intermediate between the infraorder Scolecophidia (blindsnakes) and the infraorder Alethinophidia (true snakes), and is sister to all other alethinophidians.

The genus Anomochilus has in the past been placed in the family Aniliidae.

The three species of anomochilids much resemble those of the family Cylindrophiidae (Asian pipesnakes). However, anomochilids lack both a chin groove and teeth on their pterygoid.

Geographic range
They are found in West Malaysia and on the Indonesian island of Sumatra.

Species

T) Type species.

Taxonomic history
The name of the genus was originally Anomolochilus, which was given to it by T.W. van Lidth de Jeude in 1890. In 1901, C. Berg pointed out the name was already occupied by a genus of Coleoptera (beetles), and he proposed as a replacement the name Anomochilus.

The genus, together with Cylindrophis, was previously assigned to the subfamily Cylindrophinae under the family Uropeltidae, but both were removed by Cundall et al. (1993) to prevent a paraphyletic relationship.

References

Further reading
Berg, "Charles". 1901. "Herpetological Notes". Comunicaciones del Museo Nacional de Buenos Aires 1 (8): 289–291. (Anomochilus, new name, p. 289). (in English).
Cundall D, Wallach V, Rossman DA. 1993. "The systematic relationships of the snake genus Anomochilus ". Zool. J. Linnean Soc. 109 (3): 275–299. (Anomochilidae, new family).

External links
 Anomochilids at Life is Short, but Snakes are Long

 
Snake genera